The 2020 Chicago Fire FC season was the club's 25th year of existence, as well as their 23rd in Major League Soccer. This was the Fire's first full year under the ownership of Joe Mansueto following his purchase of the club on September 13, 2019. This was also the Fire's first season back in city limits, playing in Soldier Field for the first time since 2005. The Fire faced Atlanta United FC in their first home match. The team also announced a rebrand on November 21, 2019. They became known as Chicago Fire Football Club (Chicago Fire FC) and changed their logo. The change was met with large amounts of negative reaction on social media. The Fire failed to advance out of the group stage of the MLS is Back Tournament. After finishing 11th in the Eastern Conference, the team did not qualify for the MLS Cup Playoffs.

Current squad 
As of March 6, 2020. Sources: Chicago Fire official roster and Official MLS Roster

Player movement

In

Out

Unsigned trialists and draftees 

The Fire also had several academy players in the camp- Chris Brady (G), Javier Casas (M), Brian Gutierrez (M), Alex Monis (F), and Allan Rodriguez (M).

Technical staff

Standings

Eastern Conference table

Overall table

MLS is Back – group stage

Match results

Preseason

Major League Soccer 
Due to changes in the schedule, this will be the first season where the Fire don't face every club in the league (three clubs in the Western Conference). They did not compete against Real Salt Lake.
Kickoff times are in CST (UTC-06)

MLS is Back Tournament

Open Cup 

Kickoff times are in CST (UTC-06)

Squad statistics

Games played

Goalkeeping statistics

Goalscoring and assisting record

MLS Regular Season

Open Cup

MLS regular season

Cards

MLS Regular Season

Open Cup

Totals

Note: Italics indicates a player who left during the season

Player awards

Fire awards
Man of the Match awards

Note: Italics indicates player left after his first call up

National team call-ups 

Francisco Calvo
2019–20 CONCACAF Nations League A Match vs Haiti, October 10
2019–20 CONCACAF Nations League A Match vs Curaçao, October 13
2019–20 CONCACAF Nations League A Match vs Haiti, November 14
2019–20 CONCACAF Nations League A Match vs Curaçao, November 17

Elliot Collier
Friendly vs Republic of Ireland, November 14
Friendly vs Lithuania, November 17

Cristian Martínez
2019–20 CONCACAF Nations League A Match vs Mexico, November 15
Friendly vs Bolivia, November 19

Przemysław Frankowski
Euro 2020 Qualifying Match vs Latvia, October 10
Euro 2020 Qualifying Match vs North Macedonia, October 13
Euro 2020 Qualifying Match vs Israel, November 16
Euro 2020 Qualifying Match vs Slovenia, November 19

Michael Azira
2021 Africa Cup of Nations qualification Group B Match vs Burkina Faso, November 13
2021 Africa Cup of Nations qualification Group B Match vs Malawi, November 17

 United StatesU-23 TeamDjordje Mihailovic
Friendly vs El Salvador, October 15
United International Football Festival Semifinal Match vs Brazil, November 14
United International Football Festival Third Place Match or Final vs United Gran Canaria, November 17
U-20 TeamAndre Reynolds II
Friendly vs Mexico U-20, January 16
Friendly vs Mexico U-20, January 18
U-17 TeamGabriel Slonina
UEFA Development Tournament match vs Spain, February 19
UEFA Development Tournament match vs England, February 21
UEFA Development Tournament match vs Denmark, February 24
U-16 TeamGabriel Slonina
2019 NIKE International Friendly vs Netherlands, November 14
2019 NIKE International Friendly vs US U-17, November 16
2019 NIKE International Friendly vs Turkey, November 18

Note: Italics indicates player left after his first call up

References

External links 
 

Chicago Fire FC seasons
Chicago Fire Soccer Club
Chicago Fire
Chicago Fire